Aleksandar Petrović (8 September 1914 – 31 July 1987) was a Serbian football player and manager.

Club career
He was part of the famous SK Jugoslavia attack that become famous in the years before the Second World War league interruption. He is also remembered as an excellent striker, being the sixth all-time pre-1941 Yugoslav First League top-scorer, with a total of 51 goals.

Having been born in Rača, a suburb of Kragujevac, he still young came to Belgrade, where he played for several clubs. He started playing for Palilulac, between 1930 and 1932, and later in Čukarički, until 1936, when he moved to one of the major clubs in the country, SK Jugoslavija. He will play with them until 1943, becoming one of the major league strikers and a fans idol. Those were his best years in which he also became a member of the national team. All the success was interrupted by an unfortunate injury of the meniscus that would make him pause for entire three years! He never fully recovered, despite having returned and played four seasons with FK Vojvodina, between 1945 and 1949, and a single season with FK Željezničar Sarajevo where despite the difficulties, and his age, he managed to score 8 goals in 14 matches.

International career
He played nine matches for the Yugoslavia national football team and scored five goals. His debut was on 22 May 1938 against Italy in Genova, a 0–4 loss, and his final match was on 22 September 1940 in Belgrade against Romania, also a defeat, this time by 1–2. He was also part of Yugoslavia's squad for the football tournament at the 1948 Summer Olympics, but he did not play in any matches.

Coaching career
After finishing his playing career, he managed a number of Yugoslav clubs such as NK Jesenice, FK Proleter Zrenjanin, FK Željezničar Sarajevo, RFK Novi Sad, FK Radnički Niš and FK Zvezda Subotica, being considered his major achievement the promotion to the Yugoslav First League of a relatively minor Serbian club FK Crvenka, in 1970.

After retiring from football, he continued living in Subotica where he eventually died in summer of 1987 with 73 years of age.

References

External links
 

1914 births
1987 deaths
Sportspeople from Kragujevac
Serbian footballers
Yugoslav footballers
Yugoslavia international footballers
Olympic footballers of Yugoslavia
Olympic silver medalists for Yugoslavia
Footballers at the 1948 Summer Olympics
Olympic medalists in football
Association football forwards
FK Palilulac Beograd players
FK Čukarički players
SK Jugoslavija players
FK Vojvodina players
FK Željezničar Sarajevo players
Yugoslav First League players
Yugoslav football managers
Serbian football managers
FK Radnički Niš managers
FK Željezničar Sarajevo managers
FK Sutjeska Nikšić managers
FK Bačka 1901 managers
Medalists at the 1948 Summer Olympics